This is a list of things named after George H. W. Bush,  the 41st president of the United States.

Schools
 George Herbert Walker Bush Elementary School in Addison, Texas
George Bush High School in Richmond, Texas
Bush School of Government and Public Service at Texas A&M University in College Station, Texas

Libraries
George H.W. Bush Presidential Library and Museum in College Station, Texas

Buildings
George Bush Center for Intelligence in Langley, Virginia.  Bush served as the Director of Central Intelligence from 1976 to 1977.
 George H.W. Bush State Office Building in Austin, Texas. Scheduled to be completed in 2022 
 George H.W. Bush and George W. Bush United States Courthouse and George Mahon Federal Building in Midland, Texas

Airport
George Bush Intercontinental Airport in Houston, Texas

Roads
George Bush Drive West in College Station, Texas, where the George H.W. Bush Presidential Library and Museum is located.
President George Bush Turnpike in Dallas, Texas. The 52-mile toll road runs through several Dallas suburbs, forming a partial loop around the city.

Parks
George Bush Park in Houston, Texas

Ships
USS George H.W. Bush (CVN-77) The Nimitz-class supercarrier of the United States Navy is named for Former President George H. W. Bush, who was a naval aviator during World War II.

Trains
Union Pacific 4141

Other
Bushism (introduced by his son George W. Bush)

See also
Presidential memorials in the United States
List of places named for George Washington
List of places named for Thomas Jefferson
List of places named for James Monroe
List of places named for Andrew Jackson
List of places named for James K. Polk
List of things named after Ronald Reagan
List of things named after Bill Clinton
List of things named after George W. Bush
List of things named after Barack Obama
List of things named after Donald Trump
List of educational institutions named after presidents of the United States

References

Bush, George H. W.
George H. W. Bush-related lists